1070 is a pure aluminium alloy. It is a wrought alloy with a high corrosion resistance and an excellent brazing ability. 

1070 Aluminium alloy has aluminium, iron, silicon, zinc, vanadium, copper, titanium, magnesium, and manganese as minor elements.

Chemical Composition

Applications 
Aluminium 1070 alloy is used in the following areas: 

 General industrial components
 Building and construction
 Transport
 Electrical material
 PS plates
 Strips for ornaments
 Communication cables
 Refrigerator and freezer cabinets

References

Aluminium alloy table 

Aluminium alloys